Kakatahi is a New Zealand town located  from Wanganui, on State Highway 4 to Raetihi. The once bustling roadworkers' camp is now closed and the introduction of private contractors has seen the community dwindle, with local families contributing to a school roll of only about a dozen in 2007.

The local Ōtoko Marae is a meeting place for Te Awa Iti. It includes the Tauakira meeting house.

Education

References

Populated places in Manawatū-Whanganui
Whanganui District